Starogornovo is a rural locality (a village) in Blagovarsky District, Bashkortostan, Russia. The population was 10 as of 2010. There is 1 street.

Geography 
Starogornovo is located 9 km north of Yazykovo (the district's administrative centre) by road. Khlebodarovka is the nearest rural locality.

References 

Rural localities in Blagovarsky District